Michail "Mikis" Theodorakis (29 July 1925 – 2 September 2021) was a Greek composer and lyricist credited with over 1,000 works.

He scored for the films Zorba the Greek (1964), Z (1969), and Serpico (1973). He composed the "Mauthausen Trilogy", also known as "The Ballad of Mauthausen", which has been described as the "most beautiful musical work ever written about the Holocaust" and possibly his best work. Up until his death, he was viewed as Greece's best-known living composer. He was awarded the Lenin Peace Prize.

Politically, he was associated with the left because of his long-standing ties to the Communist Party of Greece (KKE). He was an MP for the KKE from 1981 to 1990. Despite this however, he ran as an independent candidate within the centre-right New Democracy party in 1989, in order for the country to emerge from the political crisis that had been created due to the numerous scandals of the government of Andreas Papandreou. He helped establish a large coalition between conservatives, socialists and leftists. In 1990 he was elected to the parliament (as in 1964 and 1981), became a government minister under Konstantinos Mitsotakis, and fought against drugs and terrorism and for culture, education and better relations between Greece and Turkey. He continued to speak out in favour of leftist causes, Greek–Turkish–Cypriot relations, and against the War in Iraq. He was a key voice against the 1967–1974 Greek junta, which imprisoned him and banned his songs.

Early life
Theodorakis was born on the Greek island of Chios and spent his childhood years in provincial Greek cities including Mytilene, Cephallonia, Patras, Pyrgos, and Tripoli. His father, a lawyer and a civil servant, was from the small village of Galatas on Crete and his mother, Aspasia Poulakis, was from an ethnically Greek family in Çeşme, in what is now Turkey. He was raised with Greek folk music and was influenced by Byzantine liturgy; as a child he had already talked about becoming a composer.

His fascination with music began in early childhood; he taught himself to write his first songs without access to musical instruments. He took his first music lessons in Patras and Pyrgos, where he was a childhood friend of George Pavlopoulos, and in Tripoli, Peloponnese, he gave his first concert at the age of seventeen. He went to Athens in 1943, and became a member of a Reserve Unit of ELAS. He led a troop in the fight against the British and the Greek right in the Dekemvriana. During the Greek Civil War he was arrested, sent into exile on the island of Icaria and then deported to the island of Makronisos, where he was tortured and twice buried alive.

During the periods when he was not obliged to hide, not exiled or jailed, he studied from 1943 to 1950 at the Athens Conservatoire under Filoktitis Economidis. In 1950, he finished his studies and took his last two exams "with flying colours". He went to Crete, where he became the "head of the Chania Music School" and founded his first orchestra.

Studies in Paris 

In 1953, Theodorakis married Myrto Altinoglou. The following year, they travelled to Paris, where he entered the Conservatory and studied musical analysis under Olivier Messiaen and conducting under Eugene Bigot.

His symphonic works: a Piano concerto, his first suite, his first symphony, and his scores for the ballet: Greek Carnival, Le Feu aux Poudres, Les Amants de Teruel, received international acclaim. In 1957, he won the Gold Medal in the Moscow Music Festival. In 1959, after the successful performances of Theodorakis's ballet Antigone at Covent Garden in London, the French composer Darius Milhaud proposed him for the American Copley Music Prize – an award of the "William and Noma Copley Foundation", which later changed its name to "Cassandra Foundation" as the "Best European Composer of the Year". His first international scores for the film Ill Met by Moonlight and Honeymoon (aka Luna de Miel), directors: Michael Powell and Emeric Pressburger, were successful: The Honeymoon Song, title song of the later, became part of the repertoire of The Beatles.

Back to Greek roots 

In 1960, Theodorakis returned to Greece and his roots in Greek music: With his song cycle Epitaphios and contributed to a cultural revolution in his country. His most significant and influential works are based on Greek and world poetry – Epiphania (Giorgos Seferis), Little Kyklades (Odysseas Elytis), Axion Esti (Elytis), Mauthausen (Iakovos Kambanellis), Romiossini (Yannis Ritsos), and Romancero Gitano (Federico García Lorca) – he attempted to give back to Greek music a dignity which in his perception it had lost. He developed his concept of "metasymphonic music" (symphonic compositions that go beyond the "classical" status and mix symphonic elements with popular songs, Western symphonic orchestra and Greek popular instruments).

He founded the Athens Little Symphony Orchestra and gave many concerts in the country, trying to familiarize people with symphonic music.

After the assassination of Gregoris Lambrakis in May 1963 he founded the Lambrakis Democratic Youth ("Lambrákides") and was elected its president. Under Theodorakis's impetus, it started a vast cultural renaissance movement and became the greatest political organisation in Greece with more than 50,000 members. Following the 1964 elections, Theodorakis became a member of the Greek Parliament, associated with the left-wing party EDA. Because of his political ideas, the composer was black-listed by the cultural establishment; at the time of his biggest artistic glory, a large number of his songs were censored-before-studio or were not allowed on the radio stations.

During 1964, he wrote the music for the Michael Cacoyiannis film Zorba the Greek, whose main theme, since then, exists as a trademark for Greece. It is also known as "Syrtaki dance", inspired by old Cretan traditional dances.

During the dictatorship 

On 21 April 1967 the Regime of the Colonels took power in a putsch. Theodorakis was a symbol of resistance to the military regime. He went into hiding, issued the first call for resistance against the dictatorship on 23 April. and founded the "Patriotic Front" (PAM). On 1 June, the Colonels published "Army decree No 13", which banned playing, and even listening to his music. Theodorakis was arrested on 21 August, and jailed for five months. Following his release end of January 1968, he was deported in August to Zatouna with his wife, Myrto, and their two children, Margarita and Yorgos. Later he was interned in the concentration camp of Oropos.

An international solidarity movement, headed by such personalities as Dmitri Shostakovich, Leonard Bernstein, Arthur Miller, and Harry Belafonte demanded to get Theodorakis freed. On request of the French politician Jean-Jacques Servan-Schreiber, Theodorakis was allowed to go into exile to Paris on 13 April 1970. Theodorakis's flight left secretly from an Onassis-owned private airport outside Athens. He arrived at Le Bourget Airport where he met Costa Gavras, Melina Mercouri and Jules Dassin. Theodorakis was immediately hospitalized, as he suffered from tuberculosis. His wife and children joined him a week later in France, having travelled from Greece via Italy on a boat.

He would compose, alongside Pagani, the anthem of the French Socialist Party, in 1977.

Resistance in exile 
In 1971, Mikis Theodorakis was invited to Chile by then-president Salvador Allende. In Valparaíso, he listened to a group of young people who introduced him to part of the work of the poet Pablo Neruda.Theodorakis loved it and promised to give Chile his musical opinion on the Canto General. Back to Paris, in 1972 Theodorakis met Pablo Neruda when the Greek composer was rehearsing the musicalization of Canto General. Neruda was impressed and asked him to include poems such as "Lautaro" and "A Emiliano Zapata".

He was received by Gamal Abdel Nasser and Tito, Yigal Allon and Yasser Arafat, while François Mitterrand, Olof Palme and Willy Brandt became his friends. For millions of people, Theodorakis was the symbol of resistance against the Greek dictatorship together with Melina Mercouri.

Return to Greece 

After the fall of the Colonels, Mikis Theodorakis returned to Greece on 24 July 1974 to continue his work and his concert tours, both in Greece and abroad. His return was in triumph, with huge crowds and his music playing on the radio. At the same time he participated in public affairs. In 1978, through his article For a United Left Wing, he had "stirred up the Greek political life. His proposal for the unification of the three parties of the former United Left – which had grown out of the National Liberation Front (N.L.F.) – had been accepted by the Greek Communist Party which later proposed him as the candidate for mayor of Athens during the 1978 elections." (Andreas Brandes) He was later elected several times to the Greek Parliament (1981–1986 and 1989–1993) and for two years, from 1990 to 1992, he was a minister in the government of Constantine Mitsotakis. After his resignation as a member of Greek parliament, he was appointed General Musical Director of the Choir and the two Orchestras of the Hellenic State Radio (ERT), which he reorganised and with which he undertook successful concert tours abroad.

He was committed to raise international awareness of human rights, of environmental issues and of the need for peace and, for this reason, he initiated, along with the Turkish author, musician, singer, and filmmaker Zülfü Livaneli the Greek–Turkish Friendship Society.

From 1981, Theodorakis had started the fourth period of his musical writing, during which he returned to the symphonic music, while still going on to compose song-cycles. His most significant works written in these years are his Second, Third, Fourth and Seventh Symphony, most of them being first performed in the former German Democratic Republic between 1982 and 1989. It was during this period that he received the Lenin Peace Prize. He composed his first opera Kostas Kariotakis (The Metamorphoses of Dionysus) and the ballet Zorba the Greek, premièred in the Arena of Verona during the Festival Verona 1988. During this period, he also wrote the five volumes of his autobiography: The Ways of the Archangel.

In 1989, he started the fifth period, the last, of his musical writing: He composed three operas (lyric tragedies) Medea, first performed in Bilbao (1 October 1991), Elektra, first performed in Luxembourg (2 May 1995) and Antigone, first performed in Athens' Megaron Moussikis (7 October 1999). This trilogy was complemented by his last opera Lysistrata, first performed in Athens (14 April 2002): a call for peace... With his operas, and with his song cycles from 1974 to 2006, Theodorakis ushered in the period of his Lyrical Life.

In March 1997, gave a concert at the Berlin Haus der Kulturen der Welt. Afterwards he was hospitalized due to respiratory difficulties and it was when he declared that this was his last concert.

Theodorakis was Doctor honoris causa of several universities.

Later life and death 
He later lived in retirement, reading, writing, publishing arrangements of his scores, texts about culture and politics. On occasions he took position: in 1999, opposing NATO's Kosovo war and in 2003 against the Iraq War. In 2005, he was awarded the Sorano Friendship and Peace Award, the Russian International St.-Andrew-the-First-Called Prize, the insignia of Grand Officer of the Order of Merit of Luxembourg, and the IMC UNESCO International Music Prize, while already in 2002 he was honoured in Bonn with the Erich Wolfgang Korngold Prize for film music at the International Film Music Biennial in Bonn (cf also: Homepage of the Art and Exhibition Hall Bonn). In 2007, he received a Lifetime Achievement Award at the distribution of the World Soundtrack Awards in Ghent.

A final set of songs titled: Odysseia was composed by utilizing poetry written by Costas Kartelias for lyrics. In 2009 he composed a Rhapsody for Strings (Mezzo-Soprano or Baryton ad lib.). Created on 30 January 2013, Theodorakis achieved the distinction of producing one of the largest works by any composer of any time.

On 26 February 2019, Theodorakis was hospitalized due to heart problems, and on 8 March, underwent surgery to place a pacemaker. He died from cardiopulmonary arrest at his home in Athens on 2 September 2021, at the age of 96. The Greek Prime Minister declared three days of national mourning to honour him, and his body was lain in state in the chapel of the Metropolitan Cathedral of Athens, with many thousands of people, artists and political leaders from all Greek parties paying their final respects. Epitaphs were delivered by the President of the Hellenic Republic, Aikaterini Sakellaropoulou, and the General Secretary of the Communist Party of Greece, Dimitrios Koutsoumbas. Afterwards, according to his will, his body was transferred by boat overnight to be buried at his town of origin, Galatas, near Chania, Crete, where his parents' and brother's graves also are.

Political views

Israel and Jews
Theodorakis opposed Israel's occupation of Gaza and the West Bank. He criticised Greek Prime Minister George Papandreou for establishing closer relations with Israeli Prime Minister Benjamin Netanyahu, who was guilty, he said, of "war crimes in Lebanon and Gaza." Theodorakis was a vocal critic of Zionism, and referred to himself as an “anti-Zionist.” In 2003, he stated, "Everything that happens today in the world has to do with the Zionists ... American Jews are behind the world economic crisis that has hit Greece as well." He described himself as "anti-Israel and anti-Semite," because "this small nation (Israel) is the root of evil". Theodorakis later apologized for the comments, stating in a letter to the Central Council of Jews in Greece that they only applied to policies of the Israeli government and its ally the US, also stating that he "loves the Jewish people". 
In 2013, he condemned Golden Dawn for Holocaust denial.

Views of the United States
Theodorakis was a long-time critic of the United States. During the invasion of Iraq, he called Americans "detestable, ruthless cowards and murderers of the people of the world". He said he would consider anyone who interacted with "these barbarians", for whatever reason, as his enemy. Theodorakis greatly opposed the NATO bombing of Yugoslavia  during the Yugoslav Wars. He participated in a charity concert protesting the bombing in 1999.

2010–2011: Non-political movement
On 1 December 2010, Mikis Theodorakis founded "Spitha: People's Independent Movement", a non-political movement which calls people to gather and express their political ideas. The main goal of "Spitha" is to help Greece stay clear of its economic crisis. On 31 May 2011, Theodorakis gave a speech attended by approximately 10,000 people in the center of Athens, criticising the Greek government for the loan debt it has taken from the International Monetary Fund.

Positions on Macedonia
In 1997 Mikis Theodorakis stated on the Macedonian issue that "The name does not matter so much, as long as the peoples live in peace". Later, in an interview, he stressed "In fact, this country is being pushed towards improving relations with Greece. So why shouldn't it be possible for our relations to prosper at all levels and whatever comes up? The Customs Union, confederation, etc. are just conditions. In any case, I think that the name issue will be overcome when the relations between the two peoples reach such a point that the name will not matter at all".

Theodorakis was one of the main speakers at the Rally for Macedonia in Athens, which took place on 4 February 2018. In his speech, he stated that "Macedonia is one, was, is and will always be Greek." The statements garnered support from parties in parliament, while even Golden Dawn MPs welcomed Mikis Theodorakis' shift on the name of Macedonia. Members of SYRIZA and Yiannis Boutaris commented negatively on Theodorakis' statements. Also, the day before the rally, a group of anarchists threw paint at the entrance of his house and then wrote threatening messages, such as: "Your story starts from the mountain and ends in the national swamp of Syntagma Square.

Works
His song cycles are based on poems by Greek authors, as well as by García Lorca and Neruda: Epitaphios, Archipelagos, Politia A-D, Epiphania, The Hostage, Mykres Kyklades, Mauthausen, Romiossini, Sun and Time, Songs for Andreas, Mythology, Night of Death, Ta Lyrika, The Quarters of the World, Dionysos, Phaedra, Mia Thalassa, Os Archaios Anemos, Ta Lyrikotera, Ta Lyrikotata, Erimia, Odysseia.
Theodorakis released two albums of his songs and song cycles on Paredon Records and Folkways Records in the early seventies, including his Peoples' Music: The Struggles of the Greek People (1974).

Symphonic works
1945: The Apocalypse (Ode to Beethoven)
1947: Festival of Asi Gonia 
1952: Piano Concerto "Helikon"
1953: First Symphony ("Proti Simfonia")
1954–1959: 3 Orchestral Suites
1958: Piano Concerto No 1 
1981: Symphony No 2 ("The Song of the Earth"; text: Mikis Theodorakis) for children's choir, piano, and orchestra
1981: Symphony No 3 (texts: Dionysios Solomos; Constantine P. Cavafy; Byzantine hymns) for soprano, choir, and orchestra
1983: Symphony No 7 ("Spring-Symphony"; texts: Yannis Ritsos; Yorgos Kulukis) for four soloists, choir, and orchestra
1986–1987: Symphony No 4 ("Of Choirs") for soprano, mezzo, narrator, choir, and symphonic orchestra without strings
1995: Rhapsody for Guitar and Orchestra
1995: Sinfonietta  
1996: Rhapsody for Cello and Orchestra
2008: Rhapsody for Trumpet and Orchestra (for Piccolo Trumpet, orchestrated by Robert Gulya)
2010: "Andalusia" for Mezzo and Orchestra
Source:

Chamber music
1942: 	Sonatina for piano
1945: 	Elegy No 1, for cello and piano
1945: 	Elegy No 2, for violin and piano
1946: 	String Quartet No 1
1946: String Quartet No 2 "To Kimiterio"
1946: 	Duetto, for two violins
1947: 	Trio, for violin, cello and piano
1947: 	11 Preludes, for piano
1947: 	Sexteto, for piano, flute and string quartet
1949: 	Study for two violins and cello
1952: 	Syrtos Chaniotikos, for piano and percussion
1952: 	Sonatina No 1, for violin and piano
1955: 	Little Suite, for piano
1955: 	Passacaglia, for two pianos
1959: 	Sonatina No 2, for violin and piano
1989:  Choros Assikikos, for violoncello solo
1996:  Melos, for piano
2007:  East of the Aegean, for cello and piano

Cantatas and oratorios
1960: Axion Esti (text: Odysseas Elytis)
1969: The March of the Spirit (text: Angelos Sikelianos)
1971–82: Canto General (text: Pablo Neruda)
1981–82: Kata Saddukaion Pathi (Sadducean-Passion; text: Michalis Katsaros) for tenor, baritone, bass, choir and orchestra
1982: Liturgy No 2 ("To children, killed in War"); texts: Tassos Livaditis, Mikis Theodorakis) for choir
1982–83: Lorca, for voice, solo guitar, choir, and orchestra (based on Romancero Gitano (text: Federico García Lorca, translated by Odysseas Elytis)
1992: Canto Olympico, for voice, solo piano, choir, and orchestra (texts: Dimitra Manda, Mikis Theodorakis)
1999: Requiem (text: St. John Damascene)

Hymns
1970: 	Hymn for Nasser
1973: 	Hymn for the Socialist Movement in Venezuela
1973: 	Hymn for the Students. dedicated to the victims of Polytechnical School in Athens (18.11.)
1977: 	Hymn of the French Socialist Party
1978: 	Hymn for Malta
1982: 	Hymn of P.L.O.
1991: 	Hymn of the Mediterranean Games
1992: 	"Hellenism" (A song for the opening ceremony of the 1992 Summer Olympics,later used again during the 2004 Summer Olympics.)

Ballets
1953: Carnaval (choreography: Rallou Manou)
1958: Le Feu aux Poudres (choreography: Paul Goubé)
1958: Les Amants de Teruel (choreography: Milko Šparemblek)
1959: Antigone (choreography: John Cranko)
1972: Antigone in Jail (choreography: Micha van Hoecke)
1979: Elektra (choreography: Serge Kenten)
1983: Sept Danses Grecques (choreography: Maurice Béjart)
1987–88: Zorba il Greco (choreography: Lorca Massine)

Operas
1984–1985: Kostas Karyotakis (The Metamorphosis of Dionysos)
1988–1990: Medea
1992–1993: Elektra
1995–1996: Antigone
1999–2001: Lysistrata

Music for the stage

Classical tragedies
1959–1960: Phoenician Women (Euripides)
1960–1961: Ajax (Sophocles)
1965: Trojan Women (Euripides)
1966–1967: Lysistrata (Aristophanes)
1977: The Suppliants (Aeschylus)
1979: The Knights (Aristophanes)
1986–1988: Oresteia: Agamemnon, Choephorae, Eumenides (Aeschylus)
1987: Hecuba (Euripides)
1990: Antigone (Sophocles)
1992: Prometheus Bound (Aeschylus)
1996: Oedipus Rex (Sophocles)
2001: Medea (Euripides)

Modern plays
1960–1961: To Tragoudi tou Nekrou Adelfou (Ballad of the Dead Brother), Musical Tragedy (text: Mikis Theodorakis)
1961–1962: Omorphi Poli (Beautiful City), revue (Bost, Dimitris Christodoulou, Christofelis, et al.)
1963: I Gitonia ton Angelon (The Quarter of Angels), Music-drama (Iakovos Kambanelis)
1963: Magiki Poli (Enchanted City), revue (Mikis Theodorakis, Notis Pergialis, Michalis Katsaros)
1971: Antigoni stin Filaki (Antigone in Jail), drama
1974: Prodomenos Laos (Betrayed People), music for the theatre (Vangelis Goufas)
1975: Echtros Laos (Enemy People), drama (Iakovos Kambanelis)
1975: Christophorus Kolumbus, drama (Nikos Kazantzakis)
1976: Kapodistrias, drama (Nikos Kazantzakis)
1977: O Allos Alexandros ("The Other Alexander"), drama (Margarita Limberaki)
1979: Papflessas, play (Spiros Melas)

International theatre
1961: Enas Omiros (The Hostage), drama (Brendan Behan)
1963: The Chinese Wall, drama (Max Frisch)
1975: Das Sauspiel, tragicomedy (Martin Walser)
1979: Caligula, drama (Albert Camus)
1978: Polites B' Katigorias (Second-Class Citizens), drama (Brian Friel)
1980: Perikles, tragedy, (William Shakespeare)
1994: Macbeth, tragedy (William Shakespeare)

Principal film scores
Source:
1952–53: Eva (Director: Marya Plytas)
1953: The Barefoot Battalion (Director: Greg Tallas)
1953: O Golgotas Mias Orfanis (Director: Dinos Dadiras, Spiros Nikolaidis)
1957: Ill Met by Moonlight (Director: Michael Powell)
1960: Honeymoon (Luna de miel) (Director: Michael Powell, Choreography: Léonide Massine)
1960: Faces in the Dark (Director: David Eady)
1961: Shadow of the Cat (Director: John Gilling)
1961: Phaedra (Director: Jules Dassin)
1962: The Lovers of Teruel (Director: Raymond Rouleau)
1962: Five Miles to Midnight (Director: Anatole Litvak)
1962: Electra (Director: Michael Cacoyannis)
1964: Zorba the Greek (Director: Michael Cacoyannis)
1966: A Bullet Through the Heart (Director: Jean-Daniel Pollet)
1967: The Day the Fish Came Out (Director: Michael Cacoyannis)
1969: Z (Director: Costa-Gavras)
1971: Biribi (Director: Daniel Moosman)
1971: The Trojan Women (Director: Michael Cacoyannis)
1972: State of Siege (Director: Costa-Gavras)
1973: The Battle of Sutjeska (Director: Stipe Delić)
1973: Serpico (Director: Sidney Lumet)
1974: The Rehearsal (Director: Jules Dassin)
1976: Actas de Marousia (Director: Miguel Littín)
1977: Iphigenia (Director: Michael Cacoyannis)
1980: The Man with the Carnation (Director: Nikos Tzimas)
2013: Recycling Medea (Director: Asteris Kutulas)

Scores
Rhapsody for Cello and Orchestra
March of the spirit (Oratorio, Full Score)
Axion esti (Oratorio Full Score)
Zorbas Ballet (Suite – Ballet, Full Score)
Carnaval (Suite – Ballet Full, Score)
Adagio (Full Score) & Sinfonietta (Full Score)
Epiphania Averof (Cantata)
Canto Olympico (Oratorio)
Les Eluard

 (Phaedra)

Romancero Gitano

 (Dionysus)
 (Epiphany)
 (Epitaph)

Internationally available CD releases

Mikis Theodorakis & Zülfü Livaneli	— Together (Tropical), 1997.
Mikis Theodorakis	 — First Symphony & Adagio (Wergo/Schott)
Mikis Theodorakis — Mikis (Peregrina)
Mikis Theodorakis	 — Symphony No. 4 (Wergo/Schott)
Mikis Theodorakis	 — Symphony No. 7 (Wergo/Schott)
Mikis Theodorakis	 — Requiem: For soloists, choir and symphonic orchestra (Wergo/Schott)
Mikis Theodorakis	 — Symphonietta & Etat de Siege (Wergo/Schott)
Maria Farantouri & Rainer Kirchmann — Sun & Time: Songs by Theodorakis (Lyra)
Mikis Theodorakis — Mauthausen Trilogy: In Greek, Hebrew and English (Plaene)
Mikis Theodorakis	 — Carnaval — Raven (for mezzo and symphonic orchestra) (Wergo/Schott)
Mikis Theodorakis — Resistance (historic recordings) (Wergo/Schott)
Mikis Theodorakis — First Songs (Wergo/Schott)
Mikis Theodorakis — Antigone/Medea/Electra (3-Opera Box) (Wergo/Schott)
Mikis Theodorakis	 — The Metamorphosis of Dionysus (Opera) (Wergo/Schott)
Mikis Theodorakis	 — Rhapsodies for Cello and Guitar (Wergo/Schott)
Mikis Theodorakis 	— East of the Aegean (for cello and piano) (Wergo/Schott)
Mikis Theodorakis & Francesco Diaz  — Timeless (Wormland White)
Source:

 Maria Farantouri	— Poetica (Songs by Theodorakis) (Peregrina)
 Maria Farantouri 	— Asmata (Songs by Theodorakis) (Peregrina)
 Irene Papas 	— Songs of Theodorakis (RCA Records, 1968)

Written works
Books in Greek by Theodorakis:
Το χρέος (The Debt), ed. Terradia tetradias tis Democracy 1970–1971.
Μουσική για τις μάζες (Music for the masses), ed. Olkos, 1972.
Στοιχεία για μια νέα πολιτική» (Elements for new politics), ed. Papazisis, 1972.
Δημοκρατική και συγκεντρωτική αριστερά (Democratic and centralized left), ed. Papazisis, 1972.
Οι μνηστήρες της Πηνελόπης (The suitors of Penelope), ed. Papazisis, 1976.
Περί Τέχνης (On Art), ed. Papazisis, 1976.
Η αλλαγή. Προβλήματα ενότητας της Αριστεράς (Change. Problems of Unity of the Left), 1978.
Μαχόμενη Κουλτούρα (Fighting Culture), 1982. 
Για την ελληνική μουσική (For Greek Music), 1983. 
Ανατομία της σύγχρονης μουσικής (Anatomy of Contemporary Music), ed. Synchroni Epochi, 1983. 
Star System, ed. Kaktos, 1984.
Οι δρόμοι του αρχάγγελου (The Roads of the Archangel), autobiography, ed. Cedros, 1986–1995. 
Ζητείται Αριστερά (The Left is Wanted), ed. Sideris, 1989.
Αντιμανιφέστο (Antimanefesto), ed. Gnoseis. 
Πού πάμε (Where are we going?), ed. Gνoseis, 1989. 
Ανατομία της Μουσικής (Anatomy of Music), ed. Alpheios, 1990.
Να μαγευτώ και να μεθύσω (To be enchanted and drunk), ed. Livani, 2000.
Το μανιφέστο των Λαμπράκηδων (The Lambrakis Manifesto), ed. Helleniki Grammata, 2003. 
The trilogy Πού να βρω την ψυχή μου... (Where to find my soul...), ed. Livani, 2003.
Μάνου Χατζηδάκι εγκώμιον (Praise of Manos Hadjidakis), ed. Janos, 2004.
Σπίθα για μια Ελλάδα ανεξάρτητη και δυνατή (Spark for an independent and strong Greece), ed. Janos, 2011.
Διάλογοι στο λυκόφως-90 συνεντεύξεις (Dialogues in the twilight-90 interviews), ed. Janos, 2016.
Μονόλογοι στο λυκαυγές (Monologues in the twilight), ed. Janos, 2017.
“The Dialectics of Harmony (Στη Διαλεκτική της Αρμονίας), co-authored with Kostas Gouliamos, Gutenberg, 1918
Source:

Poems
Το τραγούδι του νεκρού αδελφού (The Song of the Dead Brother).
Ο Ήλιος και ο Χρόνος (The Sun and Time). 
Αρκαδία Ι (Arcadia I).
Αρκαδία VI (Arcadia VI). 
Αρκαδία X (Arcadia X). 
Τραγούδι της γης (Song of the Earth) from Symphony No. 2. 
Source:

Awards and decorations
Lenin Peace Prize, USSR (1983).
Order of the Phoenix, Greece (1995).
Officer of the Legion of Honour, France (1996).
Doctor honoris causa of the University of Athens (1996).
Doctor honoris causa Aristotle University of Thessaloniki (2000). 
"Erich Korngold" prize, Germany (2002). 
2005 International Music Prize, UNESCO International Music Council (2005).
Legion of Honour, France (2007).
Honorary member of the Academy of Athens (2013).
A picture of Theodorakis was included in the "In Memoriam" section of the 94th Academy Awards Ceremony

References

Further reading
 Jean Boivin, Messiaen's Teaching at the Paris Conservatoire: A Humanist Legacy, in Siglind Bruhn, Messiaen's Language of Mystical Love (New York, Garland, 1998), 5–31: 10
 George Giannaris: Mikis Theodorakis. Music and Social Change, Foreword by Mikis Theodorakis. G. Allen, London, 1972
 Gail Holst: Myth & Politics in Modern Greek Music, Adolf M. Hakkert, Amsterdam, 1980
 Mikis Theodorakis: Journals of Resistance. Translated from the French by Graham Webb, Hart-Davis MacGibbon, London, 1973
 Mikis Theodorakis: Music and Theater, Translated by George Giannaris, Athens, 1983
 Asteris Koutoulas: O Mousikos Theodorakis / Theodorakis the Musician (in Greek). "Nea Synora – A. A. Livami, 1998. 
 Guy Wagner: Mikis Theodorakis. Mia Zoi yia tin Ellada. Typothito – Giorgos Dardanos, 2002.  (The biography exists also in French: Mikis Theodorakis. Une Vie pour la Grèce. Editions Phi, Luxembourg, 2000; and in German: Mikis Theodorakis. Ein Leben für Griechenland. Editions Phi, Luxembourg, 1995)
 George Logothetis: Mikis Theodorakis: the Greek soul, translated from the Greek by Phillipos Chatzopoulos, Agyra editions 2004, . The Chinese version has been published by Shanghai Baijia Publishing House in 2008, .
 Asteris Kutulas: Mikis Theodorakis. A Life in pictures (in German), Coffee-table book with 1 DVD & 2 CDs. Schott Music, Mainz 2010, 
Arja Saijonmaa: En ung naken kvinna : mötet med Mikis (A young naked woman – the meeting with Mikis),  (bound) Stockholm : Piratförlaget, 2011 Swedish 443 pages, [16] picture pages + 1 CD with four songs by Mikis Theodorakis.

External links
 
 Extensive Website
 Ιστοσελίδα Κίνησης Ανεξάρτητων Πολιτών – website of Independent Citizens Movement at archive.org.
 Official Site (Schott Music) with non-proprietary audio files, discography, recent performances and news
 Lilian Voudouri Library
 Alexia – Mikis Theodorakis MySpace page
 Nicolas Mottas, Mikis Theodorakis: A Legend for Greece  – American Chronicle, 28 July 2009.
 
 film scores
 complete discography 
 
 Interview with Mikis Theodorakis by Bruce Duffie, 19 May 1994

1925 births
2021 deaths
20th-century Greek musicians
20th-century classical composers
21st-century Greek musicians
21st-century classical composers
Anti-Americanism
Ballet composers
Best Original Music BAFTA Award winners
Commandeurs of the Légion d'honneur
Communist Party of Greece politicians
Greek MPs 1981–1985
Greek MPs 1990–1993
Greek Resistance members
Greek classical composers
Greek classical musicians
Greek communists
Greek exiles
Greek film score composers
Greek opera composers
Greek prisoners and detainees
Lenin Peace Prize recipients
Male film score composers
Male opera composers
Members of the Lambrakis Democratic Youth
Officers of the Order of Merit of the Grand Duchy of Luxembourg
People from Chios
Resistance to the Greek junta
Greek People's Liberation Army personnel
Greek torture victims